Hedingen is a railway station in the Swiss canton of Zurich, situated in the municipality of Hedingen. The station is located on the Zurich to Zug via Affoltern am Albis railway line.

This railway station, although not a major station, provides the ability to travellers to purchase tickets for either directions. It has a Kiosk (a convenience store) attached to it where travellers can purchase a variety of products or they can also have a kebab at the nearby Kebab shop. It is also located within walking distance from the local supermarket (Volg) and the local bakery (Bäckerei Conditorei Confiserie), which is already set up for Christmas (see picture below).

Service 
Hedingen station is an intermediate stop on Zurich S-Bahn services S5 and S14. During weekends, there is also a nighttime S-Bahn service (SN5) offered by ZVV.

Summary of S-Bahn services:

 Zürich S-Bahn:
 Nighttime S-Bahn (only during weekends):

References

External links 
 

Railway stations in the canton of Zürich
Swiss Federal Railways stations
Railway stations in Switzerland opened in 1864